Ludwig I or Louis I (25 August 1786 – 29 February 1868) was King of Bavaria from 1825 until the 1848 revolutions in the German states. When he was crown prince, he was involved in the Napoleonic Wars. As king, he encouraged Bavaria's industrialization, initiating the Ludwig Canal between the rivers Main and the Danube. In 1835, the first German railway was constructed in his domain, between the cities of Fürth and Nuremberg, with his Bavaria joining the Zollverein economic union in 1834. After the July Revolution of 1830 in France, Ludwig's previous liberal policy became increasingly repressive, in 1844, Ludwig was confronted during the Beer riots in Bavaria. During the revolutions of 1848 the king faced increasing protests and demonstrations by students and the middle classes. On 20 March 1848, he abdicated in favour of his eldest son, Maximilian.

Ludwig lived for another twenty years after his abdication and remained influential. An admirer of ancient Greece and the Italian Renaissance, Ludwig patronized the arts and commissioned several neoclassical buildings, especially in Munich. He was an avid collector of arts, amassing paintings from the Early German and Early Dutch periods as well as Graeco-Roman sculptures.

All living legitimate agnatic members of the House of Wittelsbach descend from him.

Crown prince
Born in the Zweibrücker Hof in Straßburg as Ludwig Karl August von Pfalz-Birkenfeld-Zweibrücken, he was the son of Count Palatine Maximilian Joseph of Zweibrücken (later Maximilian I Joseph of Bavaria) by his first wife Princess Augusta Wilhelmine of Hesse-Darmstadt. At the time of his birth, his father was an officer in the French army stationed at Strasbourg. He was the godson and namesake of Louis XVI of France. 

On  1 April 1795 his father succeeded Ludwig's uncle, Charles II, as duke of Zweibrücken, and on  16 February 1799 became Elector of Bavaria and Count Palatine of the Rhine, the Arch-Steward of the Empire, and Duke of Berg on the extinction of the Sulzbach line with the death of the elector Charles Theodore. His father assumed the title of King of Bavaria on  1 January 1806.

Starting in 1803 Ludwig studied in Landshut where he was taught by Johann Michael Sailer and in Göttingen. On 12 October 1810 he married Therese of Saxe-Hildburghausen (1792–1854), the daughter of Frederick, Duke of Saxe-Hildburghausen. The wedding was the occasion of the first-ever Oktoberfest.

Ludwig strongly rejected the alliance of his father with Napoleon I of France but in spite of his anti-French politics the crown prince had to join the emperor's wars with allied Bavarian troops in 1806. As commander of the 1st Bavarian Division in VII Corps, he served under Marshal François Joseph Lefebvre in 1809. He led his division in action at the Battle of Abensberg on 20 April.

With the Treaty of Ried of 8 October 1813 Bavaria left the Confederation of the Rhine and agreed to join the Sixth Coalition against Napoleon in exchange for a guarantee of her continued sovereign and independent status. On 14 October, Bavaria made a formal declaration of war against Napoleonic France. The treaty was passionately backed by Crown Prince Ludwig and by Marshal von Wrede.

Already at the 1815 Congress of Vienna, Ludwig advocated a German national policy. Until 1816 the crown prince served as governor-general of the Duchy of Salzburg, whose cession to Austria he strongly opposed. His second son Otto, the later King of Greece, was born there. Between 1816 and 1825, he spent his years in Würzburg. Ludwig supported generously as a Philhellene the Greek War of Independence, in which he in the war of 1821 provided a loan of 1.5 million florins from his private funds.

In 1817 Ludwig was also involved in the fall of Prime Minister Count Max Josef von Montgelas whose policies he had opposed. He succeeded his father on the throne in 1825.

Reign

Ludwig's rule was strongly affected by his enthusiasm for the arts and women and by his overreaching royal assertiveness.

An enthusiast for the German Middle Ages, Ludwig ordered the re-erection of several monasteries in Bavaria which had been closed during the German mediatisation. He reorganized the administrative regions of Bavaria in 1837 and re-introduced the old names Upper Bavaria, Lower Bavaria, Franconia, Swabia, Upper Palatinate and Palatinate. He changed his royal titles to Ludwig, King of Bavaria, Duke of Franconia, Duke in Swabia and Count Palatine of the Rhine. His successors kept these titles.

Ludwig's plan to reunite the eastern part of the Palatinate with Bavaria could not be realized. The Electoral Palatinate, a former dominion of the Wittelsbach, had disappeared under Napoleon when France first annexed the left bank of the Rhine, including about half of the Palatinate, and then gave what remained on the right bank including, Mannheim and Heidelberg, to Baden during the German Mediatization of 1803. In 1815, Baden's possession of Manheim and Heidelberg was confirmed and only the left bank territories were given back to Bavaria. Ludwig founded the city of Ludwigshafen there as a Bavarian rival to Mannheim.

Ludwig moved the Ludwig-Maximilians-Universität from Landshut to Munich in 1826. The king also encouraged Bavaria's industrialization. He initiated the Ludwig Canal between the rivers Main and the Danube. In 1835 the first German railway was constructed in his domain, between the cities of Fürth and Nuremberg. Bavaria joined the Zollverein in 1834.

As Ludwig had supported the Greek fight of independence his second son Otto was elected king of Greece in 1832. Otto's government was initially run by a three-man regency council made up of Bavarian court officials.

After the July Revolution of 1830 in France, Ludwig's previous liberal policy became more and more repressive. The Hambacher Fest in 1832 revealed the discontent of the population caused by high taxes and censorship. In connection with the unrest of May 1832, some 142 political trials were initiated. The seven death sentences that were pronounced were commuted to long-term imprisonment by the king. About 1,000 political trials were to take place during Ludwig's reign. The strict censorship, which he had reinstated after having abolished it in 1825, was opposed by large sectors of the population.

In 1837 the Ultramontanes backed by the Roman Catholic Church gained control of the Bavarian parliament and began a campaign of changes to the constitution, such as removing civil rights that had earlier been granted to Protestants, as well as enforcing political censorship. On 14 August 1838, the King issued an order for all members of the military to kneel in the presence of the Blessed Sacrament at Corpus Christi processions and church services. This policy, which had been in place when Bavaria was still almost purely Catholic in the period before 1803, had been discontinued the inclusion of large Protestant areas. Catholic disturbances during the funeral of the Protestant Queen Caroline of Baden in 1841 caused a scandal. This treatment of his beloved stepmother permanently softened the attitude of Caroline's stepson Ludwig I, who up until that time had been a strong opponent of Protestantism in spite of his marriage to the Protestant princess Therese of Saxe-Hildburghausen. The Ultramontanes' regime only ended due to their demands against the naturalization of Ludwig I's Irish-born mistress Eliza Gilbert (better known by her stage name Lola Montez). Ludwig resented this move and the Ultramontanes under Karl von Abel were pushed out.

Already in 1844, Ludwig was confronted with the Beer riots in Bavaria. During the revolutions of 1848 the king faced increasing protests and demonstrations by the students and the middle classes. The king had ordered to close the university in February and on 4 March a large crowd assaulted the Armory to storm the Munich Residenz. Ludwig's brother Prince Karl managed to appease the protesters, but now the royal family and the Cabinet turned against Ludwig. He had to sign the so-called "March Proclamation" with substantial concessions. On 16 March 1848 it was followed by renewed unrest because Lola Montez had returned to Munich after a short exile. Ludwig had to let her be searched by the police on 17 March, which was the worst humiliation for him. Not willing to rule as a constitutional monarch, Ludwig abdicated on 20 March 1848 in favour of his eldest son, Maximilian.

Ludwig lived for another twenty years after his abdication and remained influential, especially as he continued several of his cultural projects. Most of his time in Munich his residence was the neo-Gothic Wittelsbacher Palais, once built for his successor and unloved by Ludwig. He died at Nice in 1868, and was buried in St. Boniface's Abbey, Munich he had ordered to be built.

Cultural legacy

As admirer of ancient Greece and the Italian Renaissance, Ludwig patronized the arts as principal of many neoclassical buildings, especially in Munich, and as fanatic collector. Among others he commissioned the Walhalla temple, the Befreiungshalle, the Villa Ludwigshöhe, the Pompejanum, the Ludwigstrasse, the Bavaria statue, the Ruhmeshalle, the Glyptothek, the Old and the New Pinakothek. His architects Leo von Klenze and Friedrich von Gärtner also strongly influenced the cityscape of modern Athens.

Already as crown prince Ludwig collected Early German and Early Dutch paintings, masterpieces of the Italian renaissance, and contemporary art for his museums and galleries. He also placed special emphasis on collecting Greek and Roman sculpture. Through his agents, he managed to acquire such pieces as the Medusa Rondanini, the Barberini Faun, and, in 1813, the figures from the Temple of Aphaea on Aegina. One of his most famous conceptions is the celebrated "Schönheitengalerie" (Gallery of Beauties), in the south pavilion of his Nymphenburg Palace in Munich. A collection of 36 portraits of the beautiful women painted between 1827 and 1850 mostly by Joseph Karl Stieler.

Also after his abdication, Ludwig remained an important and lavish sponsor for the arts. This caused several conflicts with his son and successor Maximilian. Finally, Ludwig financed his projects from his own resources.

Because of King Ludwig's philhellenism, the German name for Bavaria today is spelled "Bayern" instead of "Baiern", while the German dialect spoken there has retained its original spelling "Bairisch" — note the I versus the Greek-derived Y.

Ludwig was an eccentric and notoriously bad poet. He would write about anything, no matter how trivial, with strings of rhyming couplets. For this, the king was teased by Heinrich Heine who wrote several mocking poems in Ludwig's style. Ironically, Ludwig's Walhalla temple added Heine's bust to its collection in 2009.

Private life and issue
In private life Ludwig was, in spite of his royal assertiveness, modest and companionable and was even known for his often shabby attire. Ludwig was hard of hearing and had a birthmark on his forehead which was often concealed in portraits.

Ludwig had several extramarital affairs and was one of the lovers of Jane Digby, an aristocratic English adventuress. Another affair was the Italian noblewoman Marianna Florenzi. His affair with Lola Montez also caused some scandal.

Issue by Princess Therese of Saxe-Hildburghausen ( 8 July 1792 –  26 October 1854; married on  12 October 1810 in Theresienwiese, Munich)

Honours

Ancestry

See also
 Ann O'Delia Diss Debar, claimed to be the daughter of Ludwig and Lola Montez
 King Ludwig Oak, monument named after Ludwig

References

Sources
 Heinz Gollwitzer, Ludwig I. von Bayern. Königtum im Vormärz, Munich 1986 (²1997).

External links

1786 births
1868 deaths
19th-century Kings of Bavaria
Princes of Bavaria
House of Wittelsbach
Monarchs who abdicated
People of the Revolutions of 1848
People from Strasbourg
German philhellenes in the Greek War of Independence
German commanders of the Napoleonic Wars
German art collectors
19th-century art collectors
Grand Crosses of the Military Order of Max Joseph
Grand Crosses of the Order of Saint Stephen of Hungary
Knights of the Golden Fleece of Austria
Grand Crosses of the Order of Christ (Portugal)
Grand Croix of the Légion d'honneur